Magozd is a settlement in the Municipality of Kobarid in the Littoral region of Slovenia.

Name
The village was attested in written sources in 1409 as Namabisgonden, circa 1439 as Na mali gosden, and in 1763–87 as Magost zu Dresenze. The name is derived from *Mal(i) gozd (literally, 'little woods'), via *Ma gozd, with syncope of the second syllable.

Church
A small church dedicated to Saint Anne can be found just outside the village. It was built in the late 15th century and the belfry was added in the 17th century. It also has a 17th-century wooden altar.

References

External links
Magozd on Geopedia

Populated places in the Municipality of Kobarid